UTC+12:00 is an identifier for a time offset from UTC of +12:00.

As standard time (year-round)
Principal cities: Petropavlovsk-Kamchatsky, Mata Utu, Majuro, Yaren, Funafuti, South Tarawa on Tarawa

North Asia
Russia – Kamchatka Time 
Far Eastern Federal District
Chukotka Autonomous Okrug and Kamchatka Krai

Oceania

Pacific Ocean

Polynesia 
France
Wallis and Futuna
Tuvalu

Micronesia 
United States
Wake Island – Time in the United States
Marshall Islands
Kiribati
Gilbert Islands
(Including the Islands of Abaiang, Abemama, Aranuka, Arorae, Banaba, Beru, Butaritari, Kuria, Maiana, Makin, Marakei, Nikunau, Nonouti, Onotoa, Tabiteuea, Tamana and Tarawa) 
Nauru

Antarctica
Time bases in Antarctica. See also Time in Antarctica
Chile
Base General Bernardo O'Higgins Riquelme
Norway
Peter I Island
New Zealand
Amundsen-Scott South Pole Station
McMurdo Station
Ross Dependency

As standard time (Southern Hemisphere winter)
Principal cities: Wellington, Auckland, Suva

Oceania

Melanesia 
Fiji

Australasia 
New Zealand (except Chatham Islands) – New Zealand Standard Time

Antarctica
Some research bases in Antarctica, in particular the South Pole and the McMurdo Station. At New Year, these places are the first in the world to see the Sun, which is then visible at midnight.

As daylight saving time (Southern Hemisphere summer) 
Principal towns: Burnt Pine, Kingston

Oceania 
Australia
Norfolk Island

Discrepancies between official UTC+12:00 and geographical UTC+12:00

Areas in UTC+12:00 longitudes using other time zones 
Using UTC-10:00

United States
 The western part of Aleutian Islands, Alaska (standard time)

Areas outside UTC+12:00 longitudes using UTC+12:00 time

Areas between 157°30′ E and 172°30′ E  ("Physical" UTC+11:00) 
Russia
 The western part of Chukotka Autonomous Okrug
 Kamchatka Krai
United States
 Wake Island
Marshall Islands
Nauru

Areas between 180° and 157°30′ W ("Physical" UTC-12:00 and UTC-11:00) 
New Zealand
Kermadec Islands
Fiji
 Eastern parts, including:
 Ringgold Isles
 Northern Lau Group
 Southern Lau Group
 Eastern of Moala Group
 Vatoa Island
 Ono-i-Lau
 Tuvana-i-Tholo
 France
 Wallis and Futuna
Russia
 The eastern of Wrangel Island
 The easternmost part of Chukotka Autonomous Okrug, including Chukchi Peninsula and Big Diomede Island (partly within the "physical" UTC-11:00 area)

Historical changes
Kwajalein Atoll, in the Marshall Islands, advanced 24 hours to the Eastern Hemisphere side of the International Date Line by skipping August 21, 1993.

See also
Time in New Zealand
Time in Russia
UTC−12:00
Wake Island Time Zone

References

External links

UTC offsets